Ochyrotica placozona is a moth of the family Pterophoridae. It is known from Panama, Peru and Venezuela.

The wingspan is 16–19 mm. Adults are on wing in March.

External links

Ochyroticinae
Moths described in 1921
Taxa named by Edward Meyrick